Polyunsaturated fatty acids (PUFAs) are fatty acids that contain more than one double bond in their backbone.  This class includes many important compounds, such as essential fatty acids and those that give drying oils their characteristic property.

Polyunsaturated fats are fats in which the constituent hydrocarbon chain possesses two or more carbon–carbon double bonds. Polyunsaturated fat can be found mostly in nuts, seeds, fish, seed oils, and oysters. "Unsaturated" refers to the fact that the molecules contain less than the maximum amount of hydrogen (if there were no double bonds). These materials exist as cis or trans isomers depending on the geometry of the double bond.

Chemical structure 
Saturated fats have hydrocarbon chains which can be most readily aligned. The hydrocarbon chains in trans fats align more readily than those in cis fats, but less well than those in saturated fats. In general, this means that the melting points of fats increase from cis to trans unsaturated and then to saturated. See the section about the chemical structure of fats for more information.

The position of the carbon-carbon double bonds in carboxylic acid chains in fats is designated by Greek letters. The carbon atom closest to the carboxyl group is the alpha carbon, the next carbon is the beta carbon and so on. In fatty acids the carbon atom of the methyl group at the end of the hydrocarbon chain is called the omega carbon because omega is the last letter of the Greek alphabet. Omega-3 fatty acids have a double bond three carbons away from the methyl carbon, whereas omega-6 fatty acids have a double bond six carbons away from the methyl carbon. The illustration below shows the omega-6 fatty acid, linoleic acid.

While it is the nutritional aspects of polyunsaturated fats that are generally of greatest interest, these materials also have non-food applications. Drying oils, which polymerize on exposure to oxygen to form solid films, are polyunsaturated fats. The most common ones are linseed (flax seed) oil, tung oil, poppy seed oil, perilla oil, and walnut oil. These oils are used to make paints and varnishes.

Polyunsaturated fatty acids can be classified in various groups by their chemical structure:
 methylene-interrupted polyenes
 conjugated fatty acids
 other PUFAs

Based on the length of their carbon backbone, they are sometimes classified in two groups:
 short chain polyunsaturated fatty acids (SC-PUFA), with 18 carbon atoms
 long-chain polyunsaturated fatty acids (LC-PUFA) with 20 or more carbon atoms

Dietary sources

Types

Methylene-interrupted polyenes 
These fatty acids have 2 or more cis double bonds that are separated from each other by a single methylene bridge (--).  This form is also sometimes called a divinylmethane pattern.

The essential fatty acids are all omega-3 and -6 methylene-interrupted fatty acids. See more at Essential fatty acids—Nomenclature

Omega-3

Omega-6

Omega-9

Conjugated fatty acids

Other polyunsaturated fatty acids

Function and effects
The biological effects of the ω-3 and ω-6 fatty acids are largely mediated by their mutual interactions, see Essential fatty acid interactions for detail.

Health

Potential benefits 

Because of their effects in the diet, unsaturated fats (monounsaturated and polyunsaturated) are often referred to as good fats; while saturated fats are sometimes referred to as bad fats. Some fat is needed in the diet, but it is usually considered that fats should not be consumed excessively, unsaturated fats should be preferred, and saturated fats in particular should be limited.

In preliminary research, omega-3 fatty acids in algal oil, fish oil, fish and seafood have been shown to lower the risk of heart attacks. Other preliminary research indicates that omega-6 fatty acids in sunflower oil and safflower oil may also reduce the risk of cardiovascular disease.

Among omega-3 fatty acids, neither long-chain nor short-chain forms were consistently associated with breast cancer risk. High levels of docosahexaenoic acid (DHA), however, the most abundant omega-3 polyunsaturated fatty acid in erythrocyte (red blood cell) membranes, were associated with a reduced risk of breast cancer. The DHA obtained through the consumption of polyunsaturated fatty acids is positively associated with cognitive and behavioral performance.   In addition DHA is vital for the grey matter structure of the human brain, as well as retinal stimulation and neurotransmission.

Contrary to conventional advice, an evaluation of evidence from 1966-1973 pertaining to the health impacts of replacing dietary saturated fat with linoleic acid found that participants in the group doing so had increased rates of death from all causes, coronary heart disease, and cardiovascular disease. Although this evaluation was disputed by many scientists, it fueled debate over worldwide dietary advice to substitute polyunsaturated fats for saturated fats.

Pregnancy 
Polyunsaturated fat supplementation does not decrease the incidence of pregnancy-related disorders, such as hypertension or preeclampsia, but may increase the length of gestation slightly and decreased the incidence of early premature births.

Expert panels in the United States and Europe recommend that pregnant and lactating women consume higher amounts of polyunsaturated fats than the general population to enhance the DHA status of the fetus and newborn.

Cancer 
Results from observational clinical trials on polyunsaturated fat intake and cancer have been inconsistent and vary by numerous factors of cancer incidence, including gender and genetic risk. Some studies have shown associations between higher intakes and/or blood levels of polyunsaturated fat omega-3s and a decreased risk of certain cancers, including breast and colorectal cancer, while other studies found no associations with cancer risk.

Thermal degradation
The heating causes a free radical chain reaction, which oxidizes the PUFAs into hydroperoxide, which further decomposes into a complex mixture of secondary products.

See also 

 Fatty acid
 Essential fatty acid
 Saturated fat
 Unsaturated fat
 Monounsaturated fat
 Polyunsaturated fat

References

Citations

General References

 

Fatty acids
Nutrition
Nutrients

pt:Gordura poliinsaturada